Captain Ultra (Griffin Gogol) is a superhero appearing in American comic books published by Marvel Comics.

Publication history

He first appeared in Fantastic Four #177 (Dec. 1976) and was created by Roy Thomas, George Pérez and Joe Sinnott.

Thomas publicly stated, "Captain Ultra was a parody character that George Perez and I made up for FF #177, in our own spoof of DC's auditions for the Legion of Super-Heroes (it had that quasi-legion of rejected heroes, remember?).  We deliberately gave him what I've always called a "church-window" costume... one that has a zillion design pieces, and nearly as many colors, with nothing to really focus the eye.  But of course, since he was a virtual Superman, we had to give him a "Kryptonite," so we made it fire, as a sort of homage to the Martian Manhunter.  The joke was that the Frightful Four, if they had let him join, would have been going up against the Fantastic Four--with its Human Torch--aided by a man who passed out in the presence of any kind of flame."

Fictional character biography
When an elderly psychologist could not afford to pay plumber Griffin Gogol, he offers to cure Gogol's smoking habit via hypnosis. However, as Gogol later learned, the psychologist was an extraterrestrial and the hypnosis unlocks Gogol's innate superhuman potential. Donning a clashing, colorful costume, Gogol became the superhero Captain Ultra. However, it is revealed he suffers from severe pyrophobia (fear of fire) as a side-effect.

Captain Ultra's first appearance is as an applicant to the supervillain team called the Frightful Four. He is at first enthusiastically accepted by the other three villains, ecstatic at his large array of powers. However, when one of them began to light a cigarette in celebration, Captain Ultra faints in the presence of the match. He is promptly rejected.

An unauthorized television program informs Gogol of the super-hero team the Defenders. Captain Ultra is one of a large group to investigate by traveling to the Richmond Riding Academy on Long Island. There he works with a small group to stop a crime spree back in New York. Like most of the other applicants, he is not pleased with the Defenders and never really petitions the core group for membership.

Soon after, he moves to Chicago. He has since had a minor career as a solo superhero, often teaming up with heroes like Thor to battle minor villains.

He eventually overcomes his pathological fear of fire thanks to years of extensive therapy under the super-powered psychiatrist Doc Samson. Gogol began a new career as a stand-up comedian and battled Ekl'r: Demon Without Humor. His comedy career takes him across the country. Superheroics interfere with this, such as when the underground dirt creature 'Mud Pi', kidnaps his entire potential audience, the citizenry of 'Wash Basin', Texas. Captain Ultra manages to safely rescue them all.

Doorman begged him to join the Great Lakes Avengers, but Captain Ultra angrily rejects him.

Griffin then became the leader for the Nebraska team of the Initiative program, part of a government controlled superhero program. After two of his teammates, Paragon and Gadget are killed, Griffin briefly fights Iron Man to protect the rest of his group. He is seen investigating the circumstances of Paragon and Gadget's tragic deaths with Doc Samson and Iron Man. During the course of their investigation it is revealed that there are two new Initiative recruits in the process of being fast-tracked to the Nebraska team, although Captain Ultra expressed irritation at the prospect of having to "babysit the punks".

Captain Ultra is recruited by Wonder Man (whose ionic energy leaking problem was affecting his judgement) to join his Revengers. During the Revengers' attack on Avengers Mansion, he is scared off when Doctor Strange uses an illusion spell to make him believe he is on fire. He and the rest of the Revengers were defeated by all three Avengers teams and were remanded to the Raft. Captain Ultra's reason for joining the Revengers is that despite the fact that he was on the Initiative, he resents being disrespected despite having as much power as an Avenger.

During the Avengers: Standoff! storyline, Captain Ultra was an inmate of Pleasant Hill, a gated community established by S.H.I.E.L.D.

Powers and abilities
Captain Ultra's powers were released through hypnosis by an alien, giving him the power of flight and superhuman strength, speed, durability, reflexes and endurance. He also gained the psionic ability to become intangible at will, see through substances (X-ray vision), and the ability to project his breath forward with great concussive force — among others. He can apparently tap his "ultra-potential", enabling him to manifest a wide variety of mental and physical "ultra-feats", and even once told an "ultra-joke".

In other media

Television
 Captain Ultra appears in the Fantastic Four: World's Greatest Heroes episode "The Cure", voiced by Paul Dobson. After Ben Grimm's "condition" had been cured, the team was auditioning possible replacements and Captain Ultra was among the candidates alongside Flatman, Frog-Man, She-Hulk, Squirrel Girl, and Texas Twister. In a scene reminiscent of his introduction with the Frightful Four, Captain Ultra was considered a top candidate because of his powers until Human Torch "lit up" his thumb while giving a thumbs-up gesture, causing Captain Ultra to faint and be summarily rejected for his pyrophobia. In an interview with Marvel Animation Age, at the comment "There are lots of cameos in the FF's 'audition' scene, including the Fabulous Frog-Man and the Texas Twister...", the writer Dan Slott declared "And Captain Ultra! Don't forget Captain Ultra! What a kick, right? I can't believe that I had a hand in bringing Texas Twister to the small screen. Now I can die happy".
 Captain Ultra makes a cameo appearance in the Ultimate Spider-Man episode "Damage Control", voiced by Cam Clarke. He appears as a spokesperson for Damage Control.

References

External links
 Marvel Directory entry
Characters created by George Pérez
Characters created by Roy Thomas
Comics characters introduced in 1976
Fictional characters with superhuman durability or invulnerability
Fictional comedians
Marvel Comics characters who can move at superhuman speeds
Marvel Comics characters with superhuman strength
Marvel Comics superheroes